Tafelberg (Table Mountain) is a large flat-topped hill in Curaçao, an island state in the Dutch Caribbean.

The Tafelberg mesa is in southeastern Curaçao, near the Santa Barbara beach. It is formed mostly of the Quaternary limestone that forms the south-east of Curaçao, although there are also commercially-significant phosphate and calcareous sand deposits.

Fossils of Pleistocene giant tortoises, Chelonoidis, of an estimated  carapace length have been found in fill deposits.

The vegetation of the area is sparse, owing to the endemic lack of water on Curaçao. Comparisons of grazed and inaccessibly ungrazed areas show that the natural vegetation was predominantly of the bromeliad Tillandsia flexuosa, but that this could not tolerate grazing and since the introduction of livestock by humans, primarily goats, has largely been replaced by annual grasses, prickly pear and shrubby acacias.

Mining 

Phosphate mining began at Santa Barbara in the 1870s, although by 1900 it had been abandoned and the island was in an economically near-derelict state. Mining stopped in 1891, largely owing to a dispute between the landowner and John Godden, the English operator of the mine, and the last exports were in 1895, after 175,000 tons had been exported. It re-opened though in 1913 and was still in operation at the time of  visit in 1947. The first railway on the island was built for phosphate traffic, a gravity-worked cable funicular from the mountain to the harbour on Fuikbaai near Nieuwpoort.

Limestone is also mined in the area and with the great expansion and prosperity post-WWII, this was in demand for the production of cement and, with local sand, concrete for local construction, aided by cheap fuel as distillation waste from the refinery. By the 1960s, this had led to a perceptible change in the shape of the mountain when viewed from a distance. To preserve its appearance, mining since has adopted a 'hollow-tooth' strategy, where mining proceeds and has hollowed out much of the volume of the mountain, whilst preserving its outer periphery, at least for the remaining Northern face.

References 

Landforms of Curaçao